6β-Naltrexol, or 6β-hydroxynaltrexone (developmental code name AIKO-150), is a peripherally-selective opioid receptor antagonist related to naltrexone. It is a major active metabolite of naltrexone formed by hepatic dihydrodiol dehydrogenase enzymes. With naltrexone therapy, 6β-naltrexol is present at approximately 10- to 30-fold higher concentrations than naltrexone at steady state due to extensive first-pass metabolism of naltrexone into 6β-naltrexol. In addition to being an active metabolite of naltrexone, 6β-naltrexol was itself studied for the treatment of opioid-induced constipation. It was found to be effective and well-tolerated, and did not precipitate opioid withdrawal symptoms or interfere with opioid pain relief, but development was not further pursued.

6β-Naltrexol binds to the opioid receptors with affinity (Ki) values of 2.12 nM for the μ-opioid receptor (MOR), 7.24 nM for the κ-opioid receptor (KOR), and 213 nM for the δ-opioid receptor (DOR). Hence, 6β-naltrexol shows 3.5-fold selectivity for the MOR over the KOR and 100-fold selectivity for the MOR over the DOR. Relative to naltrexone, 6β-naltrexol has about half the affinity for the MOR. In contrast to naltrexone, 6β-naltrexol is a neutral antagonist of the MOR (as opposed to an inverse agonist) and can antagonize the actions of both agonists and inverse agonists at the receptor.

6β-Naltrexol is said to have very limited capacity to cross the blood–brain barrier. However, 6β-naltrexol is still able to cross into the brain and produce central opioid receptor antagonism at sufficient levels. In animal studies, 6β-naltrexol showed about 10-fold separation in potency between peripheral and central opioid antagonism, whereas naltrexone showed no separation. Because it is a MOR neutral antagonist and hence does not reduce basal MOR signaling, 6β-naltrexol shows much lower potential for producing opioid withdrawal symptoms than naltrexone at doses achieving similar central opioid blockade in animal studies. Due to the very high levels of 6β-naltrexol that occur during naltrexone therapy, 6β-naltrexol may contribute to the central opioid receptor antagonism of naltrexone.

See also
 6β-Naltrexol-d4
 Methylnaltrexone

References

Abandoned drugs
Cyclohexanols
Cyclopropyl compounds
4,5-Epoxymorphinans
Human drug metabolites
Kappa-opioid receptor antagonists
Mu-opioid receptor antagonists
Peripherally selective drugs
Phenols
Semisynthetic opioids
Tertiary alcohols